Tanner Cochran Evans (born August 3, 1984) is a former professional tennis player from the United States.

Biography

Tennis career
A right-handed player from Dublin, Georgia, Cochran debuted at the US Open main draw as a 16 year-old in 2000, partnering Kristen Schlukebir in the women's doubles. As a junior, she and Schlukebir were semi-finalists in the girls' doubles event at the 2001 Open and she reached the round of 16 of the girls' singles at the 2002 US Open, which included a win over Ana Ivanovic.

From 2002 she played as a professional and won a $25,000 ITF singles title that year at Allentown, in addition to a second US Open doubles appearance. Cochran, who had a best ranking of 236 in the world, played in the main draw of a WTA Tour tournament for the only time at the 2003 Kroger St. Jude International in Memphis.

Personal life
She is married to former Los Angeles Angels baseball player Terry Evans.

References

External links
 
 

1984 births
Living people
American female tennis players
Tennis people from Georgia (U.S. state)
People from Dublin, Georgia
21st-century American women